Atelodora is a genus of moths belonging to the subfamily Tortricinae of the family Tortricidae.

Species
Atelodora agramma Lower, 1900
Atelodora pelochytana Meyrick, 1881

See also
List of Tortricidae genera

References

 , 1881, Proc. Linn. Soc. N.S. W. 6: 426.
 , 2005, World Catalogue of Insects 5

External links
tortricidae.com

Archipini
Tortricidae genera
Taxa named by Edward Meyrick